Krzysztof Topór (born 10 January 1972) is a Polish biathlete. He competed at the 1994 Winter Olympics and the 2002 Winter Olympics.

References

External links
 

1972 births
Living people
Polish male biathletes
Olympic biathletes of Poland
Biathletes at the 1994 Winter Olympics
Biathletes at the 2002 Winter Olympics
People from Nowy Targ